FAAA may refer to:
 Flight Attendants' Association of Australia
 Failure Analysis Associates (FaAA)

See also
 Faaa, a commune in the suburbs of Papeete in French Polynesia